Graham Township is mid. As of the 2010 census, its population was 1,668 and it contained 711 housing units.

Geography
The streams of Dry Branch, Lewis Creek, Little Creek, Neils Creek and Walton Creek run through this township.

Unincorporated towns
 Deputy

Extinct towns
 Parkers Station

Adjacent townships
 Montgomery Township, Jennings County (north)
 Lancaster Township (northeast)
 Smyrna Township (east)
 Republican Township (southeast)
 Lexington Township, Scott County (south)
 Johnson Township, Scott County (west)
 Marion Township, Jennings County (northwest)

Cemeteries
The township contains three cemeteries: Carmel, Robertson and Valley.

Major highways
  Indiana State Road 3
  Indiana State Road 56
  Indiana State Road 250
  Indiana State Road 256

References
 
 United States Census Bureau cartographic boundary files

External links
 Indiana Township Association
 United Township Association of Indiana

Townships in Jefferson County, Indiana
Townships in Indiana